Tanystoma maculicolle is a species of beetle in the family Carabidae. It is found in southern Oregon and much of California, where it has been described as "extremely common". Its common names include tule beetle, overflow bug, and grease bug. It is especially familiar in the agricultural areas of the Central Valley of California, where it sometimes invades homes.

References

Beetles described in 1828
Endemic fauna of the United States
Fauna of California
Natural history of Oregon
Beetles of North America
Platyninae